Thomas Jefferson Dryer (January 8, 1808
– March 30, 1879) was a newspaper publisher and politician in the Western United States. A member of the Oregon Territorial Legislature in 1857, Dryer is best remembered as the founder of The Oregonian, an influential and enduring newspaper in the American state of Oregon.

Dryer was also a committed mountain climber and is credited with being among the first to summit Mount St. Helens and perhaps Mount Hood.

Biography

Early years

Thomas Jefferson Dryer was born on January 10, 1808, in Ulster County, New York.

Move to Portland

After working as a journalist in New York state, Dryer came to San Francisco in 1849 with a hand-operated printing press in tow, seeking a suitable location to establish a newspaper of his own.

He initially launched a publication called the California Courier, but with limited success. While in San Francisco Dryer was recruited to relocate north to the town of Portland, Oregon by Stephen Coffin and William W. Chapman, founders and leading boosters of the fledgling enclave.

Coffin and Chapman provided a crude log cabin to Dryer to set up his press and establish his newspaper office. He was able to release the first issue of his publication, The Weekly Oregonian, on December 4, 1850 — about two weeks after the launch six miles to the south in Milwaukie, Oregon by Lot Whitcomb, The Western Star, a rival publication.

Political career

In 1856, Dryer served in the Territorial Legislature representing Multnomah and Washington Counties as a Whig. The following year, he was elected and served at the Oregon Constitutional Convention.

Dryer became a Republican and was an active supporter of Abraham Lincoln in the Presidential election of 1860, winning election as a presidential elector. Following Lincoln's victory, Dryer called in a political favor and was appointed U.S. Commissioner to the Kingdom of Hawaii.

Dryer was a heavy drinker and it was not long until his taste for alcohol was drawing public scrutiny and criticism. In March 1862 Dryer's longtime publishing rival and political foe Asahel Bush gleefully reprinted a snippet from the Yreka Union charging that the "Bad Egg" T. J. Dryer "is so constantly drunk as to render him unfit to discharge the duties of his office." By the summer of 1863 the same paper would be able to cheerfully report that "Ex-Commissioner T.J. Dryer has arrived at San Francisco, on his return from the Sandwich Islands."

Loss of the Oregonian

During Dryer's absence The Oregonian was published by Henry Lewis Pittock, a compositor and pressman who had been on the paper's staff since November 1853. Dryer was deeply in debt to Pittock for unpaid back wages and he mortgaged the publication to him as security on the unpaid debt. When Dryer made no further attempt at repayment, ownership of the Oregonian passed into Pittock's hands.

Pittock would later go into business partnership with longtime editorialist Harvey W. Scott and The Oregonian would come to see its place cemented as the state's de facto newspaper of record during the 20th century.

Mountain climber

Dryer is credited with being part of the first documented ascent of Mount St. Helens on August 27, 1853, together with three companions. He has also been reported as among the first party to climb Mount Hood, on August 8, 1854. This latter report has been disputed, with most historians claiming the Dryer attempt fell several hundred feet of the summit of Mount Hood, while an 1857 climb by Henry Lewis Pittock and four others provided better documentation of the summit having been reached.

Death and legacy

Dryer died March 30, 1879. He was 71 years old at the time of his death. Dryer's body was buried at Lone Fir Cemetery in Portland.

See also
 The Oregonian Printing Press Park

Footnotes

External links
Full body portrait of Dryer in his later years
Oregon Biographies: Thomas Jefferson Dryer from the Oregon Historical Society

American newspaper founders
19th-century American newspaper publishers (people)
Ambassadors of the United States to Hawaii
1808 births
1879 deaths
Members of the Oregon Constitutional Convention
Members of the Oregon Territorial Legislature
19th-century American politicians
Burials at Lone Fir Cemetery
Oregon pioneers
Oregon Whigs
The Oregonian people
Oregon Republicans
19th-century American journalists
American male journalists
Hawaiian Kingdom and the American Civil War
19th-century American male writers
Editors of Oregon newspapers